Harry for the Holidays is American artist Harry Connick Jr.'s second Christmas album, released in 2003. The album features Connick and his 16 piece Big Band and a full section of chordophones.

Harry for the Holidays was the best-selling holiday album in the United States of 2003 according to sales figures from Nielsen/SoundScan, with 687,000 copies sold in the U.S. that year.

A Harry For The Holidays television special, aired on NBC December 23, 2003. The TV special was released on DVD October 19, 2004. The special features Whoopi Goldberg, Nathan Lane, Marc Anthony and Kim Burrell.

Among Harry Connick Jr.'s own compositions is a duet with country singer George Jones on "Nothing New for New Year." This was one of the highlights of the album for Connick: "George Jones is my favorite singer and I was quite surprised and honored that he said yes", Connick said in 2003. "I think he's the most soulful country singer probably of all time."

An animated TV Christmas special "The Happy Elf", aired December 2, 2005 on NBC, and was released on DVD. The special is based on Connick's original song, "The Happy Elf". When asked about the song in 2003, Connick said, "'The Happy Elf' is another kid's song that came from thinking about how cool it would be to work in Santa's [work]shop."

On November 4, 2004, Harry for the Holidays was certified Platinum by the Recording Industry Association of America for shipments of one million copies in the U.S.

DualDisc version
The album was also released as a DualDisc, with the DVD side containing both Dolby Digital 5.1 surround sound mixes and high quality LPCM (better than CD) versions of the album's 16 tracks. Also included are excerpts from the above-mentioned network special; with performances of 6 songs, including his own "It Must Have Been Ol' Santa Claus" as well as a version of "Blue Christmas" (made famous, as Connick notes before the performance, by Elvis Presley during his 1968 comeback special). An interview with Connick and a trailer for The Happy Elf are also included.

Track listing

Musicians
Harry Connick Jr. – Piano & vocals
Ned Goold – Alto Sax
James Greene – Alto Sax
Jerry Weldon – Tenor Sax
Mike Karn – Tenor Sax
Dave Schumacher – Baritone Sax
Roger Ingram – Trumpet
Derrick Gardner – Trumpet
Leroy Jones – Trumpet
Joe Magnarelli – Trumpet
Mark Mullins – Trombone
Craig Klein – Trombone
John Allred – Trombone
Joe Barati – Bass Trombone
Neal Caine – Bass
Arthur Latin II – drums, percussion
Lucien Barbarin – Trombone
70-piece orchestra

"Nothing New For New Year"
George Jones – Vocals, Guitar
Harry Connick Jr. – Vocals, Piano
Neil Caine — Bass
Arthur Latin II – Drums
Paul Franklin – Pedal steel
Biff Watson – Guitar

Charts
2004 Top Jazz Albums, peak position # 1
2004 The Billboard 200, peak position # 12
2004 Top Internet Albums, peak position # 27

Certifications

See also
 List of Billboard Top Holiday Albums number ones of the 2000s

References

External links
 Harry for the Holidays media samples, at harryconnickjr.com

Harry Connick Jr. albums
Harry Connick Jr. video albums
2003 Christmas albums
2003 video albums
Live video albums
2003 live albums
Christmas albums by American artists
Columbia Records Christmas albums
Jazz Christmas albums